Floyd I. Clarke (born January 7, 1942) is a former acting director of the Federal Bureau of Investigation (FBI) in the United States.

Biography
Clarke was born in Phoenix, Arizona.  He attended George Washington University in Washington, D.C., where he obtained a Bachelor of Arts and later a law degree.  He joined the FBI as a special agent in 1964, working in the Birmingham, Boston, Philadelphia, and Kansas City Divisions as well as at FBI Headquarters. He progressed from special agent to supervisor, assistant special agent in charge, special agent in charge, assistant director, executive assistant director, deputy director, and finally acting director.

Bill Clinton, the forty-second president of the United States, was inaugurated on January 20, 1993, and 
resolved to replace then FBI director William S. Sessions. Sessions was dismissed on July 19 after refusing to resign, and Louis Freeh was nominated to the post at a Rose Garden ceremony the following day.  Clarke was named acting director, and served from the 19th until September 1, 1993, when Freeh was sworn in.

Clarke then retired from the FBI.  He joined MacAndrews & Forbes, a private firm specializing in acquisitions, where he served as vice president for corporate compliance.

References

External links
FBI biography

1942 births
Deputy Directors of the Federal Bureau of Investigation
Directors of the Federal Bureau of Investigation
George Washington University Law School alumni
Lawyers from Phoenix, Arizona
Living people
Politicians from Phoenix, Arizona